The Atlantic 10 Conference men's soccer tournament is the conference championship tournament in men's soccer for the Atlantic 10 Conference (A-10). The tournament has been held every year since 1987. It is a single-elimination tournament, and seeding is based on regular season records. The winner, declared conference champion, receives the conference's automatic bid to the NCAA men's soccer tournament.

Champions

Key

Finals

By school

†Former member of the Atlantic 10

Bibliography

References

External links
 

 
Recurring sporting events established in 1987